Ambulyx wilemani is a species of moth of the  family Sphingidae. It is found in the Philippines.

References

Ambulyx
Moths described in 1916
Moths of Asia